Typopeltis stimpsonii is an arachnid species first described by Charles Thorold Wood in 1862. Typopeltis stimpsonii is part of the genus Typopeltis and the family Thelyphonidae. No subspecies are listed in the Catalog of Life.

References 

Animals described in 1862
Uropygi
Endemic fauna of Japan